Larry Blank is an American composer, arranger, orchestrator and conductor. He has worked in film, theatre and television, and has been nominated for a Tony Award three times.

Early life and education
Blank was born in Brooklyn, New York on July 15, 1952, and grew up in Bayside, Queens. He began piano lessons at 16 and gained experience by performing as a rehearsal pianist, playing and conducting at various summer-stock theaters and dinner theaters around the United States.

Blank studied drama at the High School of Performing Arts, Manhattan. He was mentored by Don Pippin, Irwin Kostal and Ralph Burns. Blank later studied conducting with Rudi Bennett and piano with Leslie Harnley.

Career

Along with Alfred Newman and Glen Roven, Blank was one of the youngest conductors in Broadway history. Blank first conducted on Broadway at the age of 22, leading the orchestra as a replacement for Goodtime Charley and several other shows. On the recommendation of Don Pippin, he was hired by Michael Bennett and Marvin Hamlisch as Music Director for the International Touring Co. productions of A Chorus Line and They're Playing Our Song. Several other productions followed leading to Evita, Sugar Babies, La Cage Aux Folles and The Phantom of the Opera on the West Coast.

Blank moved to Los Angeles to continue his studies in orchestration and composition and to pursue orchestration work in film and television under the tutelage of orchestrator and composer Irwin Kostal. He was music director and arranger for numerous charity galas, benefits and television appearances. He orchestrated Barbara Cook’s Christmas CD "Count Your Blessings" as well as Christine Andreas - "Piaf/No Regrets".

Blank has arranged two songs for the Boston Pops tribute to Jerry Herman, orchestrated the ballet Zorro for composer Charles Fox, performed by the San Francisco Ballet. He orchestrated and arranged Let the Eagle Fly, a musical about labor organizer Cesar Chavez, and arranged two songs for American Idol. His arrangements are played by many pops orchestras across the US and around the world.

Blank also created orchestrations for Tommy Tune/White Tie and Tails, Three Coins in the Fountain, White Christmas and Roman Holiday at the St. Louis MUNY. He conducted during for Michael Crawford's 1999 and 2000 concert tours in Australia and the UK.

Other orchestrations, co-orchestrations and arrangements by Blank include Broadway's Fame Becomes Me, the Piccadilly Theatre's Guys and Dolls, Barry Manilow's recording of Rags to Riches, La Cage aux Folles at New York's Marquis Theatre, the West End musical Beautiful and Damned, the recording John Barrowman Swings Cole Porter, Deborah Voigt's 2003 concert with the New York Philharmonic, Carousel, Fiddler on the Roof at the Savoy Theatre and The Drowsy Chaperone at the Novello Theatre, A Christmas Story at the Fifth Avenue Theatre in Seattle, the International Achievement in Arts Awards in London, the UK The Sound of Music and Catch Me If You Can with Marc Shaiman.

Blank was the Music Director for Katie Couric's Hollywood Hits Broadway and her fund-raising tribute to West Side Story. He was Music Director/Conductor and/or vocal arranger on Broadway and in Los Angeles, for They're Playing Our Song, Evita, Sugar Babies, La Cage aux Folles, Phantom of the Opera, Teddy and Alice, Onward Victoria, Copperfield, and Colette.

In London Blank arranged, orchestrated or co-orchestrated the revival of Mack and Mabel, Who Could Ask for Anything More, Barry J. Mishon's The Stine Way, Mr. Wonderful, the Cole Porter Centennial, Stairway to the Stars, a live concert of My One and Only, The Fleet's In, The Tribute to MGM, the Judy Garland Tribute and Night of 100 Stars.

Blank was the conductor/arranger/orchestrator of Jerry Herman's title song for the film Barney's Great Adventure, and he orchestrated two songs for South Park and was Music Supervisor/Orchestrator Mrs. Santa Claus, What's the Worst That Could Happen, The Kid, Kiss the Girls, The American President, and many other films and television shows.

Blank was the Orchestrator for Jerry Herman's concept recording "Miss Spectacular" conducted by Don Pippin featuring Steve Lawrence, Christine Baranski, Davis Gaines, Karen Morrow, Debbie Gravitte and Faith Prince.

Blank composed the music for the film That Championship Season. In March 1999 he conducted the 20th Anniversary Production of Sweeney Todd at the Ahmanson Theatre in Los Angeles with Kelsey Grammer and Christine Baranski. He was asked to conduct Sweeney Todd for the Kennedy Center Sondheim Celebration in 2002 as well as a subsequent production for Wolf Trap Opera.

In 2012, his orchestrations were performed in Singin' in the Rain at the Palace Theatre in London. 

Blank has conducted at Carnegie Hall, and guest conducted in the United States, Canada, New Zealand and Australia, for the New York Philharmonic, The Los Angeles Philharmonic, The Boston Pops, Chicago Symphony Orchestra, Pittsburgh Symphony, San Francisco Symphony, and dozens of other well-known orchestras.

Blank is a regular guest conductor and orchestrator for Friday Night is Music Night on BBC Radio Two. As an expert on Broadway music, he has conducted tributes to Marvin Hamlisch, Jerry Herman, Kander and Ebb, Cahn and Van Heusen, Don Black and many more. Blank has been associated with The Oliver Awards in London for 10 years as Music Supervisor/Orchestrator and conductor. He is the resident pops conductor for the Pasadena Symphony in California. He has guest conducted for the Opera de Toulon in Toulon, France as well as conducting their celebrated production of Bernstein's Wonderful Town.

Most recently Blank orchestrated and conducted FX's Fosse/Verdon for Arranger/Composer Alex Lacamoire. He was arranger,orchestrator, and conductor for Dolly Parton's 'Christmas On The Square' for Warner Brothers/Netflix.

Blank was the MD/Conductor for Jerry Herman's Memorial at the Lunt Fontanne Theatre NYC Feb 3, 2020.

Awards and nominations 
Blank has been nominated for a Tony Award three times, for his orchestrations of Catch Me If You Can (with Marc Shaiman), White Christmas, and The Drowsy Chaperone. Blank's orchestration of eight songs for the Broadway production of The Producers was acknowledged by Doug Besterman and Mel Brooks at the 2001 Tony Awards after the show won Best Original Score.

He has been nominated six times for the Drama Desk Award for Outstanding Orchestrations for White Christmas, The Drowsy Chaperone, Catch Me If You Can, A Christmas Story, Honeymoon in Vegas and Fiddler on the Roof.

References

Additional sources 
Interview – Larry Blank
 Larry Blank Interview NAMM Oral History Library (2022)

Year of birth missing (living people)
Living people
People from Brooklyn
American musicians